The 51st Primetime Emmy Awards were held on Sunday, September 12, 1999. The ceremony show was hosted by Jenna Elfman and David Hyde Pierce. It was broadcast on Fox.

The comedy-drama Ally McBeal won Outstanding Comedy Series, which not only dethroned five-time defending champion Frasier but also became the first time Fox won that award. In the drama field The Practice won Outstanding Drama Series for the second straight year, and led all shows with four major wins on the night.

Freshman series The Sopranos led all shows with 11 major nominations. From that show, Edie Falco not only became the first actress from a Cable network (HBO) to win Lead Actress, Drama series, she became the first person from any Cable TV show series to win a Major Acting award. (Though David Clennon did win for only a guest performance in HBO's Dream On in 1993).

The real winner of the night was television writer David E. Kelley. Kelley was the creator and head writer for both series champions, Ally McBeal and The Practice. This accomplishment has not been matched since.

Winners and nominees

Programs

Acting

Lead performances

Supporting performances

Guest performances

Directing

Writing

Most major nominations
By network 
 NBC – 42
 HBO – 32
 CBS – 23
 ABC – 22
 Fox – 10

By program
 The Sopranos (HBO) – 11
 The Practice (ABC) – 9
 Ally McBeal (Fox) / Frasier (NBC) – 8
 Law & Order (NBC) / NYPD Blue (ABC) – 7
 Dash and Lilly (A&E) / Everybody Loves Raymond (CBS) / Joan of Arc (CBS) – 6

Most major awards
By network 
 ABC – 8
 NBC – 7
 HBO – 6
 CBS – 5
 Fox – 2

By program
 The Practice (ABC) – 3

Notes

In Memoriam

 Ellen Corby
 Richard Denning
 Gary Morton
 Mary Frann
 Anthony Newley
 Mark Warren
 Norman Fell
 Dana Plato
 Noam Pitlik
 Dick O'Neill
 Sylvia Sidney
 David Strickland
 Peggy Cass
 Virginia Graham
 Dane Clark
 Ed Herlihy
 Mel Tormé
 Mario Puzo
 Bill Wendell
 John Holliman
 Rory Calhoun
 Susan Strasberg
 Allen Funt
 Joseph Cates
 Esther Rolle
 Roddy McDowall
 Gene Siskel
 Flip Wilson
 DeForest Kelley
 Gene Autry

References

External links
 Emmys.com list of 1999 Nominees & Winners
 
 

051
1999 television awards
1999 in Los Angeles
September 1999 events in the United States